The America East Conference women's basketball tournament is the annual concluding tournament for the NCAA college basketball in the America East Conference. The winner of the annual tournament gains an automatic bid to the NCAA Women's Division I Basketball Championship.

History of the tournament finals

Tournament championships by school 

 Schools highlighted in pink are former members of the America East Conference

See also
America East men's basketball tournament

References
America East Championship Results